Xenochaetina flavipennis is a species of fly in the family Lauxaniidae.

References

Lauxaniidae
Insects described in 1805
Diptera of North America
Diptera of South America